Tarana-e-Pakistan is claimed to be the first national anthem of Pakistan that was played on Pakistan's national radio on 14 August 1947. An unsubstantiated claim is that it was composed by Jagannath Azad at the request of Mohammad Ali Jinnah. It was never officially adopted as Pakistan's national anthem and the "Qaumi Tarana" was officially adopted as Pakistan's national anthem in 1954.

History

Controversy
For the first time in 2004, it was claimed by an Indian journalist that the first national anthem of Pakistan was written by Jagan Nath Azad, a Hindu poet from Isakhel in Mianwali, on the personal request of Muhammad Ali Jinnah. It was alleged that Jinnah asked Azad to write the anthem on 11 August 1947 and that it was later approved by Jinnah as the official national anthem for the next year and a half. However, this claim is historically unsubstantiated, disputed and controversial. Many historians, including Safdar Mahmood and Aqeel Abbas Jafri, reject this claim and believe that Jagan Nath Azad neither met Jinnah nor wrote Pakistan's first national anthem.

Lyrics

See also

Pakistan Zindabad (anthem)
Dil Dil Pakistan
Flag of Pakistan
State emblem of Pakistan
Pakistan School Song

References

External links
The mystery about our national anthem
Bring back Jagannath Azad's Pakistan anthem

Historical national anthems
National symbols of Pakistan
Pakistani music
Asian anthems
Pakistan national anthems